The Manifesto of three-day corvee or An Imperial Edict Forbidding Sunday Labor by Serfs was issued by the Russian emperor Paul I on April 16, 1797 as a first ever legal attempt at extending the rights of Russian serfs. The document prohibited use of corvee labour on Sundays by landowners, the State and the Court, prescribing that the rest of the week should be divided in half between the landowners' requests and peasants' own needs, theoretically restricting landowners' command over labour use to just three days in a week.

External links
Paul's manifesto forbidding Sunday labor by serfs, April 5, 1797 – text translated into English.

1797 in law
18th century in the Russian Empire
1797 in the Russian Empire 

Three-day corvee
1797 documents
Reform in Russia